Nobody Special was a Christian punk band formed in 1986, in Orange County, California. It consisted of recordings by Pat Nobody and studio musicians Gene Eugene, Joey Mitchell, Chris Brigandi and Joey Taylor. The band disbanded in 1990, reunited in 1996 and disbanded again in 1997. They reunited again in 2011, with the lineup of Pat Nobody, Frank Black, Rod Reasner and Dave Schad.

Members 
Current
 Pat "Nobody" Taylor – rhythm guitar, vocals
 Frank "Black" Wesolek – lead guitar, backing vocals
 Rod Reasner
 Dave Schad

Former
 Chris "The Vax" Kovacs – bass
 Tony Cena – drums, backing vocals

Studio musicians on first recording
 Gene Eugene
 Joey Mitchell – drums
 Chris Brigandi
 Joey Taylor

Discography 
Studio albums
 Nobody Special (1987) Alarma/Frontline
 Call It Whatever You Want (1989) Broken Records

References

External links 

Musical groups disestablished in 1990
Musical groups disestablished in 1997
Musical groups established in 1986
Musical groups reestablished in 1996
Musical groups reestablished in 2011